Jon Andreas Thorbjörnson (born 1976) is a Swedish politician, teacher and former member of the Riksdag, the national legislature. A member of the Left Party, he represented Halland County between September 2018 and September 2022.

Thorbjörnson is the son of carpet installer Hans Olof Thorbjörnson and dentist Christina Thorbjörnson (née Bohlin). He has a teaching degree and was a teacher in Kungsbacka Municipality from 2003 to 2018. He was a member of the municipal council in Kungsbacka Municipality from 2014 to 2018.

References

1976 births
Living people
Members of the Riksdag 2018–2022
Members of the Riksdag from the Left Party (Sweden)
People from Kungsbacka Municipality
Swedish schoolteachers